Joseph II may refer to:
Joseph II of Constantinople (1360–1439)
Joseph II (Chaldean Patriarch) (1696–1713)
Joseph II, Holy Roman Emperor (1741–1790)
Pope Joseph II of Alexandria (died 1956)
Joseph II of Jerusalem
Joseph II of Schwarzenberg